Alex Daley is a defender who plays for P.C. United FC and the  Montserrat National team heade his debut for Montserrat against Suriname in a 7-1 defeat in a WCQ.

References

1986 births
Living people
Montserrat international footballers
Montserratian footballers
Association football defenders